The Red Chord is an American metal band from Revere, Massachusetts, formed in 1999. The group comprises vocalist Guy Kozowyk, guitarist/vocalist Mike "Gunface" McKenzie, bassist Greg Weeks and drummer Jon Rice. The band gained a fanbase with its 2002 debut album Fused Together in Revolving Doors. The second album, Clients, was released in 2005 and sold over 50,000 copies in the U.S. They released their third album, Prey for Eyes in 2007, which sold between 4,000 and 5,000 copies and debuted at No. 198 on the Billboard 200 chart. Their latest album, 2009's Fed Through the Teeth Machine, debuted at No. 180 on the Billboard 200 chart.

The Red Chord has released four studio albums, having toured in North America, Europe, and Japan.

History

Formation, Fused Together in Revolving Doors and Clients (1999–2006) 
The Red Chord was formed in Revere, Massachusetts in 1999 by vocalist Guy Kozowyk and guitarist Kevin Rampelberg. One year later, the band was joined by second guitarist Mike "Gunface" McKenzie, bassist Adam Wentworth and drummer Mike Justian. The band's name is derived from Alban Berg's opera Wozzeck, in which a schizophrenic man slits his lover's throat, then reverts to his normal self and asks, "My love, what is that red cord across your neck?" The debut album Fused Together in Revolving Doors was recorded with producer Andrew Schneider in December 2001 and released by the Robotic Empire record label. With the debut album, The Red Chord gained a substantial fanbase.

In early 2004, Wentworth and Justian announced their departure from The Red Chord and the band found replacements in bassist Gregory Weeks and drummer Jon Dow. In April that year, The Red Chord toured with Six Feet Under and others. The debut album was re-released with demo tracks, a full concert performance and the video clip for "Dreaming In Dog Years". In March, the band signed to Metal Blade. John Longstreth replaced Dow in May but exited in September. The Red Chord entered Planet Z Studios in Hadley, Massachusetts on November 1, with Brad Fickeisen as a new drummer, and recorded their second album Clients, which subsequently sold over 50,000 copies in the US.

2005 started with American tours and resumed on European tours in December. The band filmed a promotional video for the track "Antman" with director Dave Brodsky. The tour continued in North America through February 2006 until Ozzfest in June.

Prey for Eyes and Fed Through the Teeth Machine (2007–present) 

In February 2007, guitarist Jonny Fay decided to quit the band and was replaced by Mike Keller. In May 2007, the band went on another tour to Europe. The third album, Prey for Eyes, was released on July 24. The group parted ways with Keller in early September and decided not to replace him.

The band's fourth album, Fed Through the Teeth Machine, was recorded in early to mid-2009 in Milford, New Hampshire, at Backyard Studios, which is owned by the band's former guitarist Jonny Fay. The album was released on October 27, 2009. Kozowyk said that the new songs are more intense and mature than those the previous album. "It's faster and heavier, but it's definitely groove-oriented and melodic where it needs to be," he commented. Fed Through the Teeth Machine sold around 2,700 copies in the United States in its first week of release and debuted at No. 180 on the Billboard 200 chart.

In 2010, the release was followed by a headlining tour in the U.S. Due to a volcano eruption on Iceland, The Red Chord was forced to miss a co-headlining European "Machines Of Grind" tour with Aborted and Rotten Sound, who subsequently embarked on a "DIY Fuck The Volcano" tour without The Red Chord. The band later performed in Japan with Between the Buried and Me. Drummer Michael Justian rejoined the band in February 2010, shortly after Fickeisen departed. Fickeisen commented his departure: "There is no easy way to go about leaving a busy band with plans in constant motion, but a little abruptly, I chose to depart from manning the kit for The Red Chord. I have had a great time for the past five years with these guys, and wouldn't exchange it for anything. Touring is tough; everyone who's done it knows that. (...) I want to thank Greg, Guy, and Mike, and wish them the best of luck in the future." A music video for "Demoralizer", that was filmed in late 2009, was released in mid-February.

Justian departed from The Red Chord in March 2011 and the band hired Jon "The Charn" Rice of Job for a Cowboy for the forthcoming tour.

On April 15, 2013, Guy Kozowyk became a sworn officer of the Manchester, New Hampshire Police Department.  He was sworn in with six other new officers during a ceremony at police headquarters.

On February 2, 2022, the band announced they would be performing at the Decibel Metal & Beer Fest in June, marking the end of a hiatus the band had since 2015 from performing. They performed their 2005 album Clients in its entirety.

Musical style 
The majority of The Red Chord's music is composed by McKenzie and to a lesser degree by Weeks and other band members. The lyrics are written by Kozowyk. The band's grindcore based sound also incorporates elements of death metal, metalcore, hardcore punk, and progressive death metal, and is considered experimental. The Red Chord typically uses frequent tempo changes, technically proficient instrumental approach and emphasizes the element of groove in their music.

Because the band has combined several different elements of heavy music into their style, they have been considered among the very first deathcore bands due to their hybridization of death metal with metalcore/hardcore influences, however this statement is debatable because The Red Chord have always featured more eccentric influences in their music than just simply metalcore and death metal.

Kozowyk uses metalcore-esque growls and screams with occasional spoken word and is rather decipherable. Kozowyk points out Frank Mullen from Suffocation as a vocal influence, Black Sabbath as a musical influence, and Faith No More as a lyrical inspiration.

Members 
Current
Guy Kozowyk – vocals (1999–present)
Michael "Gunface" McKenzie – guitar, backing vocals (2000–present)
Gregory Weeks – bass (2004–present)
Jon Rice – drums (2011, 2014–present)

Former
Kevin Rampelberg – guitar (1999–2005)
Mike Justian – drums (2000–2004, 2010–2011)
Adam Wentworth – bass (2000–2004)
Jon Dow – drums (2004)
John Longstreth – drums (2004)
Jonny Fay – guitar (2005–2007)
Brad Fickeisen – drums (2004–2010)
Mike Keller – guitar (2007–2008)
Tim Brault – drums (2014)

Timeline

Discography 
Studio albums
 Fused Together in Revolving Doors (2002)
 Clients (2005)
 Prey for Eyes (2007)
 Fed Through the Teeth Machine (2009)

Music videos 
"Dreaming in Dog Years" (2002)
"Antman" (2005)
"Blue Line Cretin" (2005)
"Black Santa" (2006)
"Fixation on Plastics" (2006)
"Dread Prevailed" (2007)
"Demoralizer" (2009)

See also 
 Beyond the Sixth Seal

References

External links 
 

Deathgrind musical groups
American grindcore musical groups
American deathcore musical groups
Heavy metal musical groups from Massachusetts
People from Revere, Massachusetts
Metal Blade Records artists
Musical groups established in 1999
Musical quartets
Articles which contain graphical timelines
1999 establishments in Massachusetts